The Philippines competed at the 1992 Summer Olympics in Barcelona, Spain. 26 competitors, 24 men and 2 women, took part in 29 events in 9 sports. Stephen Fernandez and Beatriz Lucero won a bronze medal each in taekwondo, but their medals were not included in the official medal tally because taekwondo was only a demonstration event.

Medalists

Competitors
The following is the list of number of competitors in the Games.

Athletics

Track & road events

 
Field events

Boxing

Cycling

Equestrian

Fencing

Judo

Sailing

Men

Open

Shooting

Swimming

Men

Women

Demonstration Sports

Basque pelota
 Pablo Lorenzo
 Michael Lorenzo
 Neil Diaz
 Adrian Charles Quejada

Taekwondo

References

External links
Philippine Olympic Committee
Official Olympic Reports
International Olympic Committee results database

Nations at the 1992 Summer Olympics
1992
Summer Olympics